The first lady of the Democratic People's Republic of Korea, more commonly known as the first lady of North Korea, is the title given to the wife of the supreme leader of North Korea. However, only two wives of the supreme leader have received this title: the inaugural holder Kim Song-ae, the second wife of Kim Il-sung; and the incumbent Ri Sol-ju, the wife of Kim Jong-un.

History

During the administration of President Kim Il-sung, Kim Song-ae assumed the duties of first lady in 1963, 11 years after the marriage. The position was left vacant under the leadership of General Secretary Kim Jong-il, who married twice and had three domestic partnerships at different times. 

The position was re-established under Kim Jong-un in April 2018 when Ri Sol-ju, whom he married in 2009, was elevated to "Respected First Lady". The term had not been used since 1974, when it described Kim Song-ae. Ri was previously called "comrade" by state media; the promotion occurred ahead of the April 2018 inter-Korean summit where Ri and the first lady of South Korea, Kim Jung-sook, were in attendance.

List of first ladies of the Democratic People's Republic of Korea
The following is a list of the first ladies of North Korea.

See also
First Lady
List of leaders of North Korea
Supreme Leader of North Korea
First Lady of South Korea

References

Further reading
 

North Korea